"Forever" is a 1973 single, which was written and produced by Roy Wood. Wood played all of the musical instruments on the recording, as well as supplying lead and multi-tracked backing vocals. The song was globally published by Carlin Music Corp.

The track reached number 8 in the UK Singles Chart. The single remained in the UK chart for 13 weeks, straddling the final month of 1973 and the start of the following year. The single enjoyed a higher placing in the UK chart in January 1974, than Wizzard's "I Wish It Could Be Christmas Everyday". The A-side of the single's label bore the script "with special thanks to Brian Wilson and Neil Sedaka for their influence". The track was also released as a single in New Zealand, the Netherlands, Portugal and South Africa.

"Forever" has appeared on numerous compilation albums, including Wood's own Singles (1993, Connoisseur Records). and Through the Years: The Best of Roy Wood.

Reception
Alexis Petridis stated it was "a solo hit that imagined what it would be like if Neil Sedaka had joined the Beach Boys with beautiful results".

Charts

References

1973 songs
1973 singles
British pop songs
Songs written by Roy Wood
Song recordings produced by Roy Wood
Harvest Records singles